Yvon Ambroise (born 30 August 1942) is the Bishop Emeritus of Tuticorin. He was appointed on 1 April 2005 and was consecrated by Pedro López Quintana on 18 May 2005. Bishops Antony Anandarayar and Peter Fernando acted as co-consecrators. He succeeded Bishop Peter Fernando to become the sixth bishop of Tuticorin. His term ended on 24 February 2019 and he was succeeded by Bishop Stephen Antony Pillai.

He was born to Ponnu Tambi Ambroise and  Antoinette Ambroise in Pondicherry, India. He was ordained a priest at Immaculate Conception Cathedral, Pondicherry by Archbishop Ambrose Rayappan.

Posts Held
He has held the following positions:

 15-05-1968 – Jun. 1969 Assistant  Parish Priest at Cuddalore N.T.
 Jun. 1969 - Feb. 1970 St.Peter’s Pastoral Institute Poonamallee – Student
 Feb. 1970 - May 1971 Asst. Parish Priest at Neyveli
 May 1971- Aug. 1972 Diocesan Director of YCS & YCW
 Aug. 1972 -Jun. 1974 Parish Priest of Thurinjipoondy
 Jun. 1974 -Sep. 1976 Lent to Hyderabad, Andhra
 Regional YCS & YCW Chaplain
 Sep. 1976 – Higher Studies in Belgium
 Jan. 1983 – Asst. Director, Caritas Asia, India
 May 1988 – Executive Director of Caritas, India
 Jun. 1995 – Sabbatical Year
 25.05.1996 – 20.09.1999 Parish Priest of Quasi Parish T.R.Pattinam
 10.09.1999 – Secretary, Coordinator – Caritas Asia.
 01.04.2005 Nominated Bishop of Tuticorin.

References

 

 

1942 births
Living people
21st-century Roman Catholic bishops in India